Tsikhe is a mountain in Fereydunshahr county in Isfahan Province, Iran. Mount Tsikhe was refuge of the people of Fereydunshahr when Karim Khan Zand (1705–1779) attacked Fereydunshahr.

References 

Mountains of Iran
Fereydunshahr County
Mountains of Isfahan Province